Trechus topaz is a species of ground beetle in the subfamily Trechinae. It was described by Belousov and Kabak in 1998.

References

topaz
Beetles described in 1998